

Highest major summits in India

Other significant mountains 

 Agastyamalai
 Anamudi
 Anginda
 Apharwat Peak
 Bamba Dhura
 Bandarpunch
 Betlingchhip
 Blue Mountain
 Brammah
 Burphu Dhura
 Chandrashila
 Changuch
 Chaudhara
 Chiring We
 Churdhar
 Deo Tibba
 Deomali
 Doddabetta
 Doli Gutta
 Gangotri Group
 Gauri Parbat
 Gimmigela Chuli
 Girnar
 Gori Chen
 Guru Shikhar
 Gya
 Hanuman Tibba
 Harmukh
 Hathi Parbat
 Indrasan
 Japfü
 Jorkanden
 Kalrayan hills
 Kalsubai
 Kang Yatze
 Kangju Kangri
 Kinnaur Kailash
 Kodachadri
 Kolahoi Peak
 Kolaribetta
 Kolukkumalai
 Kumara Parvatha
 Kun Peak
 Maiktoli
 Manirang
 Meesapulimala
 Mentok (mountain)
 Mol Len
 Mukurthi
 Mullayanagiri
 Nag Tibba
 Nagalaphu
 Nanda Ghunti
 Nanda Gond
 Nanda Khat
 Nanda Kot
 Nanda Pal
 Nilkantha
 Nun Peak
 Om Parvat
 Pandim
 Parasnath
 Plateau Peak
 Pichalbetta
 Rajrambha
 Reo Purgyil
 Sangthang
 Saramati
 Shevaroy hills
 Shilla
 Sickle Moon Peak
 Siniolchu
 Sispara
 Suj Tilla East
 Suj Tilla West
 Sujarkamiltan
 Suli Top
 Sunset Peak
 Swargarohini
 Tatakooti Peak
 Tempü
 Matanga Hill

Mountain ranges
 The Himalayas
 Karakoram
 Barail Range
 Purvanchal Range
 Arakan Yoma
 Western Ghats
 Eastern Ghats
 Vindhyas
 Aravali
 Satpura

See also 
 List of Indian states and territories by highest point
 List of mountains in Nagaland
 List of Himalayan peaks of Uttarakhand
 List of mountain peaks of Maharashtra
 List of mountains and hills of the West Bengal
 List of mountains in Kerala
 List of mountain peaks of Ladakh
 List of peaks in Himachal Pradesh
 List of peaks in the Western Ghats

Notes

References

Bibliography